Cacosmia is a genus of flowering plants in the family Asteraceae. The genus is native to South America.

The genus name is derived from the Greek kakos ("bad, ugly") and -osma ("smell, stink, fragrant odour, scent, perfume").

 Species
 Cacosmia harlingii B.Nord. - Loja Province of Ecuador
 Cacosmia hieronymi H.Rob. - Ecuador (Loja Province, Azuay, Cañar)
 Cacosmia rugosa Kunth - Peru, Ecuador (Chimborazo, Imbabura, Loja Province, Azuay, Cañar)

References

 
Asteraceae genera
Flora of South America
Taxonomy articles created by Polbot